Estelle is the surname of:

 Dick Estelle (born 1942), American former baseball pitcher
 Don Estelle (1933–2003), British actor
 Jean-Baptiste Estelle (1662–1723), French consul in the Moroccan city of Salé and mayor of Marseille
 Julie Estelle (born 1989), Indonesian actress and model
 Mark Estelle (born 1981), American former football player